The Extraordinary and Plenipotentiary Ambassador of Peru to the Republic of Finland is the official representative of the Republic of Peru to the Republic of Finland. The Ambassador is concurrent to the republics of Estonia, Latvia and Lithuania.

Peru recognized Finland on June 23, 1919, and both countries established relations on March 26, 1963.

List of representatives

See also
List of ambassadors of Peru to Denmark
List of ambassadors of Peru to Norway
List of ambassadors of Peru to Sweden

References

Finland
Peru